The  is a railway line operated by the Keihan Electric Railway in Osaka, Japan. It opened on October 19, 2008, and has a ruling grade of 1 in 25 (4%).

Services
The following services operate on the Nakanoshima line, with through-running to/from the Keihan Main Line. All services stop at all stations on the Nakanoshima line.
: Nakanoshima–, 
: Nakanoshima–Kayashima,  /  → Nakanoshima (rush hours only)
: Nakanoshima–Demachiyanagi
: (weekday mornings only)
: (rush hours only)
: Demachiyanagi–Nakanoshima (weekday mornings only)

Stations

History 
 July 10, 2001: Nakanoshima High Speed Railway Company was founded.
 May 28, 2003: Construction work commenced.
 November 13, 2006: New line and station names were officially announced.
 October 31, 2007: Tunnelling was completed.
 August 1, 2008: Test running commenced.
 October 19, 2008: Line opened.

References
This article incorporates material from the corresponding article in the Japanese Wikipedia

External links
 Keihan Nakanoshima Line website (in Japanese)

Nakanoshima Line
Rail transport in Osaka Prefecture
Standard gauge railways in Japan
Railway lines opened in 2008